Antonio Augusto Ferreira Pinto Júnior or simply Júnior  (born February 28, 1986), is a Brazilian defensive midfielder. He has played for Bonsucesso, and on June 11, 2008, he was announced to sign a contract with FC Arsenal Kyiv, which plays in the Ukrainian Premier League. However, he never paid for Arsenal and moved to Grêmio Recreativo Barueri in the same year.

On 16 July 2013 he moved to Al-Faisaly who played in Jordan Premier League.

References

External links
samabfoot
Guardian Stats Centre
 CBF
 portalremate.net

1986 births
Living people
Brazilian footballers
Brazilian expatriate footballers
Expatriate footballers in Portugal
Brazilian expatriate sportspeople in Portugal
Expatriate footballers in Jordan
Expatriate footballers in Ukraine
Brazilian expatriate sportspeople in Ukraine
Association football midfielders
CR Vasco da Gama players
C.F. Estrela da Amadora players
FC Arsenal Kyiv players
Grêmio Barueri Futebol players
America Football Club (RJ) players
Bonsucesso Futebol Clube players
Vila Nova Futebol Clube players
Moreirense F.C. players
Madureira Esporte Clube players
Al-Faisaly SC players
Bangu Atlético Clube players
Sampaio Corrêa Futebol e Esporte players
Footballers from Rio de Janeiro (city)